KTZZ (93.7 FM, "Z93") is a radio station broadcasting a classic rock format. Licensed to Conrad, Montana, United States, the station serves the Great Falls area. The station is currently owned by Munson Radio and features programming from Westwood One, Jones Radio Network and Premiere Radio Networks.

History
The station was assigned the call letters KEIN on 23 November 1998. This was changed on 22 December 1999 to the current KTZZ.

References

External links

TZZ
Radio stations established in 1998
Classic rock radio stations in the United States